Samuel B. Hardy (March 21, 1883 – October 16, 1935) was an American stage and film actor who appeared in feature films during the silent and early sound eras.

Born in New Haven, Connecticut, Hardy attended Yale but left there to become an actor on stage. He entered the world of film with Biograph Studios. Hardy appeared in about 85 movies between 1915 and 1935, he was often in comedic roles. His best-known role to modern audiences is perhaps Charles Weston, the theatrical agent, in the 1933 film classic King Kong.

Hardy appeared opposite Marie Cahill in the 1910 play Judy Forgot and the 1915 film adaptation.

Hardy became ill while he was working in the film Shoot the Chutes, starring Eddie Cantor. He did not survive emergency surgery at a hospital and died of intestinal problems.

Partial filmography

 Judy Forgot (1915) - Freddy 
 Over Night (1915) - Percy Darling
 At First Sight (1917) - Hartly Poole
 Uncle Tom's Cabin (1918) - Simon Legree
 A Woman's Experience (1918) - George Roydant
 Almost Married (1919) - Lt. James 'Jim' Winthrop Jr. 
 His Father's Wife (1919) - Lieutenant James 'Jim' Winthrop Jr.
 Get-Rich-Quick Wallingford (1921) - J. Rufus Wallingford
 Mighty Lak' a Rose (1923) - Jerome Trevor
 Little Old New York (1923) - Cornelius Vanderbilt
 The Half-Way Girl (1925) - Jardine
 Bluebeard's Seven Wives (1925) - Gindelheim
 When Love Grows Cold (1926) - William Graves
 The Savage (1926) - Managing Editor
 The Great Deception (1926) - Handy
 Prince of Tempters (1926) - Apollo Beneventa
 The Perfect Sap (1927) - Nick Fanshaw
 Orchids and Ermine (1927) - Hank
 High Hat (1927) - Tony
 Broadway Nights (1927) - Johnny Fay
 The Life of Riley (1927) - Al Montague
 A Texas Steer (1927) - Brassy Gall
 Burning Up Broadway (1928) - Spike
 Turn Back the Hours (1928) - 'Ace' Kearney
 The Big Noise (1928) - Philip Hurd
 Diamond Handcuffs (1928) - Spike
 The Butter and Egg Man (1928) - Joe Lehman
 The Night Bird (1928) - Gleason
 Outcast (1928) - Jack
 Give and Take (1928) - Craig - the Industrialist
 The Rainbow (1929) - Derbyy Scanlon
 The Rainbow Man (1929) - Doc Hardy
 A Man's Man (1929) - Charlie
 On with the Show! (1929) - Jerry
 Big News (1929) - Joe Reno
 Fast Company (1929) - Dave Walker
 Acquitted (1929) - Frank Egan
 Mexicali Rose (1929) - Happy Manning
 The Girl from Mexico (1929)
 Burning Up (1930) - Windy 'Wally' Wallace
 Song of the West (1930) - Davolo
 True to the Navy (1930) - Brady
 The Gay Nineties (1930)(*aka The Floradora Girl) - Harry Fontaine
 Borrowed Wives (1930) - G.W. Parker
 The Leather Pushers (1930) - Rooney - Kane's Manager
 Reno (1930) - J.B. Berkley
 June Moon (1931) - Sam Hart
 The Millionaire (1931) - McCoy
 Annabelle's Affairs (1931) - James Ludgate
 The Miracle Woman (1931) - Bob Hornsby
 The Magnificent Lie (1931) - Larry
 Peach O'Reno (1931) - Judge Jackson
 The Dark Horse (1932) - Mr. Black
 Make Me a Star (1932) - Jeff Baird
 The Phantom of Crestwood (1932) - Pete Harris
 Face in the Sky (1933) - Triplet The Great
 Goldie Gets Along (1933) - Sam Muldoon
 King Kong (1933) - Charles Weston
 The Big Brain (1933) - Slick Ryan
 Three-Cornered Moon (1933) - Hawkins
 Ann Vickers (1933) - Ignatz Spaulding
 Curtain at Eight (1933) - Martin Gallagher - Captain of Detectives
 Little Miss Marker (1934) - Benny the Gouge
 Aunt Sally (1934) - Michael 'King' Kelly
 I Give My Love (1934) - Pogey
 Transatlantic Merry-Go-Round (1934) - Jack Summers
 Night Alarm (1934) - Editor Stephen Caldwell
 The Gay Bride (1934) - Daniel J. Dingle
 Break of Hearts (1935) - Marx
 Hooray for Love (1935) - Mr. Ganz - aka Abbey
 Powdersmoke Range (1935) - Big Steve Ogden (final film role)

Bibliography
 Goldner, Orville & Turner, George Eugene. The Making of King Kong: The Story Behind a Film Classic. A. S. Barnes, 1975.
 Low, Rachael. ''History of the British Film: Filmmaking in 1930s Britain. George Allen & Unwin, 1985 .

References

External links

 
 
Portrait gallery (University of Washington, Sayre collection)
findagrave.com
 TRAVALANCHE: Sam Hardy: Friend of Fields from the Follies(Travalanche)

1883 births
1935 deaths
American male film actors
American male silent film actors
Male actors from New Haven, Connecticut
20th-century American male actors
RKO Pictures contract players